Khottiga or Amoghavarsha IV (ruled 967–972 CE), who bore the title Nityavarsha, was a ruler of the Rashtrakuta Empire. During this period the Rashtrakutas started to decline. The Paramara King Siyaka II plundered Manyakheta and Khottiga died fighting them. This information is available from the Jain work Mahapurana written by Pushpadanta.  He was succeeded by Karka II who ruled only for a few months.

In 968 CE, Khottiga installed a panavatta at Danavulapadu Jain temple for the Mahamastakabhisheka of Shantinatha.

References
 

 
 
 

972 deaths
Hindu monarchs
10th-century Indian monarchs
Rashtrakuta dynasty